Discocleidion is a plant genus of the family Euphorbiaceae first described as a genus in 1914. It contains one accepted species, Discocleidion rufescens, endemic to China.

formerly included
moved to Alchornea 
 Discocleidion glabrum Merr., synonym of Alchornea glabra (Merr.) Hurus.
 Discocleidion ulmifolium (Müll.Arg.) Pax & K.Hoffm., synonym of Alchornea ulmifolia (Müll.Arg.) Hurus.

References

Monotypic Euphorbiaceae genera
Acalyphoideae
Endemic flora of China